Val Jean may refer to:

 Jean Val Jean, a 1935 English-language retelling of Victor Hugo's 1862 novel Les Misérables by Solomon Cleaver
 Jean Valjean, the protagonist of Victor Hugo's 1862 novel Les Misérables
 Val Jean, the Maquis starship featured in Star Trek: Voyagers pilot episode "Caretaker"